The Tudor House is a historic house on Vermont Route 8 in Stamford, Vermont.  Built in 1900 by what was probably then the town's wealthiest residents, this transitional Queen Anne/Colonial Revival house is one of the most architecturally sophisticated buildings in the rural mountain community.  It was listed on the National Register of Historic Places in 1979.

Description and history
The Tudor House is located near the southern end of the Stamford's central village, on the west side of Main Road (Vermont Routes 8/100), between Jepson Road and The Lane.  It is a -story wood-frame structure, basically rectangular in shape, with a hip roof, clapboard siding, and a stone foundation.  Its shape is obscured by the exuberant Queen Anne wealth of projecting gables, turrets, bays, and porches.  Predominant features of the front of the house are a rounded two-story turret-roofed projection on the right, and a tall gable on the left, whose roof slopes down to the first floor and shelters a recessed porch.  Inside its gable is a recessed round-arch porch opening.  The interior of the house features high quality woodwork in a more restrained Colonial Revival style.

The house was built in 1900 by John Tudor, a Welsh immigrant who had made a fortune as a mill owner in northern Vermont and settled in Stamford in 1890.  Stamford was then experiencing a population decline, and most of its architecture is conservative and vernacular.  This house, set in a somewhat prominent setting on the southern approach to the main village, is a striking departure from the surrounding houses because of its style and size.  It was built for Tudor in 1900; its architect and builder are not known.

See also
National Register of Historic Places listings in Bennington County, Vermont

References

British-American culture in Vermont
Houses on the National Register of Historic Places in Vermont
Queen Anne architecture in Vermont
Colonial Revival architecture in Vermont
Houses completed in 1900
Houses in Bennington County, Vermont
Buildings and structures in Stamford, Vermont
National Register of Historic Places in Bennington County, Vermont
Welsh-American history